A partial solar eclipse occurred on June 1, 2011. A solar eclipse occurs when the Moon passes between Earth and the Sun, thereby totally or partly obscuring the image of the Sun for a viewer on Earth. A partial solar eclipse occurs in the polar regions of the Earth when the center of the Moon's shadow misses the Earth.

This eclipse is the second of four partial solar eclipses in 2011, with the others occurring on January 4, 2011, July 1, 2011, and November 25, 2011. The eclipse belonged to Saros 118 and was number 68 of 72 eclipses in the series.

The eclipse was special since it occurred around midnight in northern Fennoscandia and northern Russia partially obscuring the midnight sun.

Visibility

Animated path

Gallery

Related eclipses

Eclipses of 2011 
 A partial solar eclipse on January 4.
 A partial solar eclipse on June 1.
 A total lunar eclipse on June 15.
 A partial solar eclipse on July 1.
 A partial solar eclipse on November 25.
 A total lunar eclipse on December 10.

Solar eclipses 2011–2014

Saros 118 

It is a part of Saros cycle 118, repeating every 18 years, 11 days, containing 72 events. The series started with partial solar eclipse on May 24, 803 AD. It contains total eclipses from August 19, 947 AD through October 25, 1650, hybrid eclipses on November 4, 1668 and November 15, 1686, and annular eclipses from November 27, 1704 through April 30, 1957. The series ends at member 72 as a partial eclipse on July 15, 2083. The longest duration of total was 6 minutes, 59 seconds on May 16, 1398.

Metonic series

Notes

References

http://eclipse.gsfc.nasa.gov/SEplot/SEplot2001/SE2011Jun01P.GIF

External links
Shadow and Substance: Partial Eclipse of the Sun June 1, 2011 
 Midnight's Solar Eclipse  APOD 2011/6/3
 SpaceWeather Gallery for partial solar eclipse of June 1, 2011
 Report about the partial eclipse in Bratsk, Russia 

2011 06 01
2011 in science
2011 06 01
June 2011 events